The Trentino-Alto Adige/Südtirol regional election of 1968 took place on 17 November 1968.

An agreement was signed with the German minority: the two provinces became Autonomous Provinces, with both provincial and regional powers, while the Autonomous Region retained its statal-devolved powers. The SVP so accepted a new alliance with the Christian Democracy. With the activation of the ordinary regions in the rest of Italy, the legislature term rose to five years.

Results

Regional Council

Source: Trentino-Alto Adige/Südtirol Region

Province of Trento

Source: Trentino-Alto Adige/Südtirol Region

Province of Bolzano

Source: Trentino-Alto Adige/Südtirol Region 

Elections in Trentino-Alto Adige/Südtirol
1968 elections in Italy